The LK50GY (Pulse Rage 50 – LK50GY-2 in Europe) is a motorcycle manufactured by Pulse Motorcycles Ltd and is currently their only 50 cc sport moped. The manufacturer's suggested retail price (SRP) for the LK50GY in the UK market is £1395. The LK50GY is particularly popular amongst 16-year-old learner drivers. The LK50GY is also very fuel economical as the manufacturer's advised fuel consumption is 141.24 MPG. The bike is 7/8 of the size of an average bike, making it easier to maneuver and support for beginners and riders of a smaller size.

External links

Specifications

Engine 
Single cylinder four-stroke, air cooled.  
Engine Brand: LK139QMB
Displacement: 50cc
Advised Fuel Consumption: 141.24 MPG
Ignition: Electronic
Starting Method: Electric, Key start
Power: 2.25 bhp
Top Speed: 50 mph depending on rider and year of bike's manufacture (35 mph when restricted for learner usage)
Dry Weight
108 kg
Gear box
 Automatic
Final drive
 Belt Driven
Frame
Cast aluminium with plastic fairing
Suspension
 Front suspension: Telescopic Forks
 Rear suspension: Twin Shock Absorber
Brakes
 Front: Hydraulic Disc
 Rear: Drum
Wheels
 Five spoke aluminium alloy
Tires
 Tubeless radial. Front 130/60-13; rear 130/70-12.
Fuel tank capacity
 7 litres / 1.5gal
Battery Voltage
12V
Battery Capacity
7a
EEC Approval Number
e4*2002/24*1681*01

Colors
 Metallic Black
 Metallic Silver
 Metallic Red

External links
 http://www.pulsemoto.co.uk/view_LK50GY-2.php.

Motorcycles of China
Motorcycles introduced in 2006